The 2012 Boston College Eagles football team represented Boston College as a member of the Atlantic Division of the Atlantic Coast Conference (ACC) in the 2012 NCAA Division I FBS football season. The were led by fourth-year head coach Frank Spaziani and played their home games at Alumni Stadium. Boston College finished the season 2–10 overall and 1–7 in ACC play to place last of six teams in Atlantic Division.

On November 25, Boston College's athletic director, Brad Bates, announced that Spaziani has been relieved of duties as head coach of the Eagles.

Schedule

Roster

References

Boston College
Boston College Eagles football seasons
Boston College Eagles football
Boston College Eagles football